Luther Harris Hitchcock (May 2, 1824 – June 4, 1867) was a New York attorney, judge, and legislator.  He was murdered by George W. Cole, a major general in the American Civil War and brother of Cornelius Cole.

Biography
Known as L. Harris Hiscock, he was born in Pompey, New York on May 2, 1824.  He taught school while studying law with Daniel Gott, and served as Pompey's School Superintendent from 1845 to 1847.

In 1848 he began to practice law in Tully. From 1849 to 1851 he was Pompey's Justice of the Peace.

Hiscock later moved to Syracuse, and in 1855 he founded with his brother Frank the law firm known today as Hiscock and Barclay.  L. Harris Hiscock was prominent in Democratic politics and served as Onondaga County Surrogate Judge from 1852 to 1856.

In 1865, by now a Republican as a result of his pro-Union position during the Civil War, Harris was elected to the New York State Assembly, and he served until his death.

While in Albany as a delegate to the state constitutional convention, Hiscock was murdered on June 4, 1867, by George W. Cole, a major general in the Union Army who accused Hiscock of having an affair with Mrs. Cole. Cole was acquitted at his 1868 trial on the grounds of "momentary insanity."

Hiscock was buried at Oakwood Cemetery in Syracuse.

Family
L. Harris Hiscock was the brother and law partner of U.S. Senator Frank Hiscock.  He was married to Lucy Bridgman (1828–1861). They were the parents of two children, including Judge Frank H. Hiscock.

References

External links

1824 births
1867 deaths
New York (state) lawyers
New York (state) Democrats
New York (state) Republicans
People from Pompey, New York
New York (state) state court judges
Members of the New York State Assembly
Burials at Oakwood Cemetery (Syracuse, New York)
American lawyers admitted to the practice of law by reading law
American justices of the peace
19th-century American politicians
19th-century American judges
19th-century American lawyers